Muhammad Azam Khan  Swati (Urdu, Pashto: اعظم خان سواتی; born June 22, 1948) is a Pakistani politician and a businessman who served as the Minister of Narcotics Control and Railways from 2020 to 2022. He is the elected senior vice president of the Pakistan Tehreek-e-Insaf. Swati, during his stay in the United States, owned a chain of stores, was a member of Pakistani American Congress, played important role in high-profile charity events. He was born in Mansehra, and belongs from the Swati tribe. He joined the Jamiat Ulema-e-Islam in 2002 and became a senator in 2003 but resigned in 2011 and joined the Pakistan Tehreek-e-Insaf (PTI). Swati had pursued the Hajj corruption case in the Supreme Court relentlessly, which ultimately forced the government to sack former religious affairs minister Hamid Saeed Kazmi. In 2018, he was again elected as a senator on PTI's ticket.
He has served as Minister of Parliamentary Affairs from 18 April 2019 to 6 April 2020 in cabinet of  Prime Minister Imran Khan.

Early life and business
Azam Khan was born in Mansehra, Khyber Pakhtunkhwa, Pakistan.  Initially, he started his career as a practicing lawyer in Karachi but then left for the US in 1978. In 1997 he established Pak-Oil Company and acquired a jobber-ship for Exxon, Chevron, Mobil, Shell and Diamond Shamrock. Besides fuel distribution and wholesale business he has handsome investments in real estate in the Beaumont-Golden Triangle area as well as in the bordering state of Louisiana.

Education
He has a degree of Bs
. economics & political science , LL.B, LL.M of International Law from University of Houston. Dr. of Jurisprudence from South Texas College of Law in 1990 and then passed Texas Bar and became attorney-at-law in Texas, US.

Politics

Mr. Swati moved back to his home country of Pakistan in 2001 and got elected as a mayor of District Mansehra.  In 2003 after President Musharaf announced the Referendum, Mr. Swati voluntarily resigned from mayorship and thereafter when the Senate election was announced, he was elected senator with the highest number of votes as an independent candidate.  After getting elected he joined JUI-F.  He took on to the Jamiat Ulema-e-Islam-Fazl party. Mr. Swati was again elected for a second term in the Senate on the JUI ticket.  Azam Khan Swati resigned from the Senate and the Jamiat Ulema-i-Islam (JUI-F), on Saturday 17 December 2011, joined the Pakistan Tehreek-e-Insaf (PTI).  After joining PTI he was elected senior vice president of PTI and led the party historical Dharna by playing a pivotal role in making it successful.  Due to his political contribution, Mr. Swati was nominated president of PTI for the province of KPK.  In May 2015 he was awarded the PTI ticket for Senate and was for the 3rd time elected as senator.  Mr. Swati's biggest contribution was the establishment of Hazara University in his home District Mansehra along with standing against corruption on every level and through every forum in Pakistan. He was also the member of Standing Committee on Commerce, Functional Committee on Government Assurance, Functional Committee on Problems of Less Developed Areas, Standing Committee on Health, Committee on Petroleum and Natural Resources, Committee on Information Technology, Standing Committee on Science & Technology, Standing Committee on Federal Education, Standing Committee on Food Security, Standing Committee on Legislation and Library Committee.

In December 2020, He was appointed Federal Minister for Railways.

Challenges and Controversies

Arrested for 'Obnoxious Tweets' 
Pakistan Tehreek-e-Insaf (PTI) senator Azam Swati was taken into custody on 13 October 2022 by the Federal Investigation Agency’s (FIA) cybercrime unit for allegedly making ‘controversial tweets’ against state institutions. The case was registered under Section 20 of the Prevention of Electronic Crimes Act (PECA) and section 109 of the offense of aiding and abetting. A district and sessions court in Islamabad on 21 October 2022 granted post-arrest bail against surety bond worth PKR 1 million to Pakistan Tehreek e Insaaf (PTI) leader Azam Swati in a case related to controversial tweets.

Swati was arrested on November 27 after the Federal Investigation Agency (FIA) booked him in Islamabad over a “highly obnoxious campaign of intimidating tweets […] against state institutions”. It was the second time that Swati was booked and arrested by the FIA over his tweets about army officials in less than two months. Islamabad High Court approved Swati’s post-arrest bail on 3 January 2023 against the submission of surety bonds worth Rs200,000.

References

1956 births
Pakistani emigrants to the United States
Living people
Pakistan Tehreek-e-Insaf politicians
University of Houston alumni
People from Mansehra District
Jamiat Ulema-e-Islam (F) politicians
Pakistani senators (14th Parliament)
Minister of Railways (Pakistan)
Imran Khan administration
Former United States citizens
Swati
People from Swat District